Imayam is a 1979 Indian Tamil-language film, directed by Muktha Srinivasan and produced by Muktha Ramaswamy. The film stars Sivaji Ganesan, Srividya, Jai Ganesh and Thengai Srinivasan. The film also marked the on-screen debut for Kannada actress Malashri. It was released on 21 July 1979.

Plot 

Sivaji and Srividya are a childless couple who bring up Sivaji's sister Yamana. Sivaji believes in total freedom while Srividya believes in complete control and restriction when it comes to bringing up their children. When Sivaji finds out that Yamana is in love with Jai Ganesh, his partner's son, he encourages her. What he does not know is that Jai Ganesh is a womanizer and masquerades as a Mr. Goody-two-shoes. He has a son with Reena, Sivaji's secretary who kills herself when she finds out that he had moved on. Sivaji attempts to expose Jai Ganesh through his son but the clever Jai Ganesh pushes for marriage with Yamana so that Sivaji would stop and he could get rich in the process. Who succeeds forms the rest of the story.

Cast 
Sivaji Ganesan
Srividya
Thengai Srinivasan
Jai Ganesh
Yamana
K. Kannan
Y. G. Mahendra
S. Yogalingam
Manorama
Meera
C. I. D Sakunthala
Reena
S. N. Parvathy
Vijaya Chandrika
Malashri (credited as Baby Jamuna)

Soundtrack 
The music is composed by M. S. Viswanathan, with lyrics by Kannadasan. The song "Gangai Yamunai" is set in Madhyamavati raga.

Reception 
Kutty Krishnan of Kalki praised the film's visuals but criticised the story.

References

External links 
 

1970s Tamil-language films
1979 films
Films directed by Muktha Srinivasan
Films scored by M. S. Viswanathan